Fuk may refer to:

a Chinese character meaning "fortune" (福), also transliterated Fook, Fuku, or Fu
FUK, IATA code of Fukuoka Airport in Japan
a Chinese given name:
Fuk Li, physicist at NASA
a misspelling, Internet spelling, or phonetic spelling of fuck

See also 
 
 FUC
 Fuck (disambiguation)
 Fuks (disambiguation)